The Storm King School (SKS) is an independent coeducational boarding and day school in the U.S. state of New York.  Established in 1867, it is one of New York's oldest boarding schools. It is a college preparatory school for students in grades 8 to post-graduate, with an enrollment of 195 and 37 faculty living on or near campus through the year.

The Storm King School ranks as the 36th best boarding school in North America. Its recent graduates matriculated into some of the top universities in the United States, including Harvard University, The University of Chicago, Georgetown University, Cornell University, Notre Dame University, NYU Stern School of Business, Tufts University, Wellesley College, University of Virginia and The US Military Academy at West Point.
Its students have also been nominated to serve as pages at the United States Senate, won prestigious scholarships with the United States Senate Youth Program, appeared in the top 20 of the American Idol competition, and received athletic scholarships to NCAA programs throughout the nation.

The school enrolls students from 27 countries. 75% percent of students are boarding, and 25% are day students. 53% are male and 47% female.

The school is accredited by the New York Association of Independent Schools, and is a member of the New York State Association of Independent Schools, the National Association of Independent Schools, the College Board, and other education organizations.

A 15-member board of trustees governs the school.

Location
The Storm King School is in Orange County, N.Y., about an hour's drive north of New York City, It sits approximately 900 feet above the west bank of the Hudson River, on a spur of Storm King Mountain, with views of the Shawangunk Mountains and distant Catskills. It adjoins Black Rock Forest Nature Preserve to the south.

The school lies in the historic Hudson Valley between West Point and Newburgh. The nearby Storm King Art Center is an outdoor sculpture museum with work by world-class sculptors and artists.

History
The Storm King School began in 1867 as the Cornwall Heights School. Dr. Louis P. Ledoux, a graduate of Amherst College and Union Theological Seminary, and a pastor of the Cornwall Presbyterian Church, founded the school after requests that he establish “a Christian school in the home of a Christian gentleman.” Dr. Ledoux purchased Wood Farm on the northern slope of Storm King Mountain, where he prepared young men for New England colleges until 1872, when he sold his interest in the school to Oren S. Cobb.
Mr. Cobb was headmaster for 15 years until 1889, when the school was sold to Dr. Carlos H. Stone.  During Stone's 29-year leadership, the school saw much growth, including increased enrollment and an enlarged physical plant.  In 1914, the school was incorporated under New York State law and renamed the Stone School.

In 1923, during the tenure of Headmaster Alvan P. Duerr, the school's name was changed to Storm King School.  In 1928, the Board of Regents of the University of the State of New York chartered SKS as a tax-exempt educational institution.

From 1932 to 1951, throughout the austere years of the Depression and World War II, SKS was led by Headmaster Anson Barker, and benefited from the patronage and participation of several prominent families who lived on the mountain, including the Abbotts, Ledouxs, Matthiesens, Partridges, Smidts and Stillmans.

Margaret Clark, the school's first female teacher (primarily in art), retired in 1938 after over forty years at SKS. Her design of the school's crest, initially created for the student publication “The Echo”, was later adopted as the school's official emblem.

During the 1950s and 1960s, the school saw considerable growth thanks in part to Stephen P. Duggan, an attorney and long-time member and chairman of the Board of Trustees who owned property adjacent to the school. Mr. Duggan oversaw the rebuilding of SKS's then 44-acre campus, including construction of The Ogden Library (1958), Dyer Hall (1958), Highmount Dormitory (1958), Dempsey Dormitory (1959), Stillman Science Building (1960–61) and a new gymnasium (1963).

In 1967 the school celebrated its 100th anniversary. It was the culmination of a nearly decade-long modernization project championed by chairman Duggan and successive SKS headmasters Burke Boyce (1952–1956), Warren Leonard (1956–1966) and Frank Brogan (1966–1974).  During centenary celebrations, ambassador-at-large Averell W. Harriman dedicated the new Walter Orr Student Commons.

In April 1968, the campus's 100-year-old Main Building, known as "Old Main", was demolished to make way for a new dormitory. Residents of Old Main moved into the new McConnell Hall in the spring of 1968. The school eventually became coeducational in September 1970.

In 1981, Dr. Rients and Suzanne Van der Woude of Cornwall gave the school 70 acres of land on Storm King Mountain, just west of the campus.  Dr. Van der Woude said he gave the land in order “to preserve it forever and so that children can learn about nature and ecology, and respect for life and earth.” The gift expanded SKS's campus to 125 acres. Girard B. Henderson (Class of '23) provided a significant grant that launched the Henderson Outdoor Recreation Program at Storm King School.

The Van der Woude property was part of a historic 17-year dispute between New York utility Consolidated Edison and the Scenic Hudson Preservation Conference, a group of concerned residents and citizens.  In 1963, Con Ed planned a massive hydroelectric plant on Storm King Mountain which would have required cutting through the mountain and flooding the Black Rock Forest to create a reservoir. Due largely to opposition from the Preservation Conference, Con Ed's plan was abandoned and the suit settled in 1982.

In 1990, during the tenure of Headmaster John H. Suitor, a roll-off shed observatory was built on campus to house a late-19th century refractor telescope, a gift of board member Robert Cobb, that was originally owned by Erard Mathiessan. It was eventually sold to finance the purchase of the school's current Parks Newtonian telescope.  The observatory was designed and built by former SKS astronomy teacher and science writer Bob Berman.

Signature programs
The Capstone Project is a voluntary, independent research project beginning in the spring of
the junior year and completed in the fall of the senior year. It synthesizes learning from previously
completed courses while focusing on the School's bedrock Skills and Knowledge for Success (S.K.S.). These 21st
century skills include strategic reading, writing, research, problem solving, technological proficiency,
collaboration, and oral presentation skills. Students are guided through the process by a course
instructor as well as “experts,” who are faculty or community mentors, with project-specific knowledge.

The Q-Terms are short, intensive courses that provide faculty and students a chance to explore
more deeply subject matter for which they have a particular passion and curiosity. Students meet
with the same class and instructors every day and pursue only the subject related to their Q-Term.
Such focus creates an arena for project-based learning, creative design, and service opportunities
that enrich and deepen students’ connection to the content.

Domestic & International Travel complements the School's academic curriculum and
community service program and adds yet another dimension to Storm King's already vibrant
student life. Storm King students broaden their horizons, experience different cultures,
and learn about the natural world through trips to Costa Rica, Peru, Fiji, Cuba, the Galapagos
Islands, New York City, Boston, the Adirondacks, and many others.

Traditions
Mountain Day
The entire Storm King School community scales Storm King 
Mountain together to mark the beginning of the new school year. This tradition dates back to 1932 when Headmaster Anson Barker instituted the very first Mountain Day.

Hudson River Plunge
In early spring, a hearty group of students and faculty take “the Plunge” into the icy waters of the Hudson River. This event, organized by the SKS Chapter of the National Honor Society to raise funds for charitable causes, has become a Storm King tradition full of laughs and cheers.

Arts Weekend
Creativity comes to life during Spring Arts Weekend. This annual event celebrates various branches of the visual, performing, and language arts.

Thursday Night Dinners
Every meal offers an amazing selection of healthy and delicious foods, but Thursday evenings are extra special as our chefs prepare “family style” dinners for the entire community. Formal dress is worn and students and faculty take the time to slow down and enjoy pleasant conversation. Afterwards, all head to the theater for a thought-provoking program.

Ringing of the Bell
After each home win at an athletic event, the victorious SKS team rushes to the bell tower in the center of campus to ring the bell to signal their triumph.

The Storm King Cup
The Storm King Cup is awarded to a SKS student each year, during commencement, “to encourage high ideals, manly sport, tenacity of purpose, earnest behavior, fair play, and true chivalry.

College placement
Storm King graduates attend some of the top universities in the United States, including Cornell University, University of Chicago, and Harvard University.

Co-curricular activities
In addition to traditional academic courses and ESL, The Storm King School offers theater and visual arts, music, dance, sports, and various clubs and community service.

Arts
The Storm King School's arts program includes Studio Art, Ceramics, Photography, Filmmaking, Fashion Design, Acting, Stagecraft, music, voice, dance, and much more. Facilities include the 230-seat Walter Reade Jr. Theatre, the Allison Vladimir Art Center.

Athletics
The Storm King School has a full athletic curriculum and competes in the New England Prep School Athletic League and competes in 18 different sports and activities. Storm King fields 26 teams at the varsity, junior varsity, and club level and is a member of The Hudson Valley Athletic League (HVAL) and The New England Private School Athletic Council (NEPSAC). Storm King is a member of the Positive Coaching Alliance.

In recent years, the boys' soccer, wrestling and basketball teams have gained prominence as some of the top teams in New York and New England Class D competition; the basketball team won the New England Prep title in 2016 and 2017 and was the top ranked team in NEPSAC class C in 2020. In Fall of 2019, the girls volleyball team won the prestigious New England Prep School Class D championship.

Fall sports: Boys and Girls Soccer, Boys and Girls Cross Country, Girls Volleyball

Winter sports: Boys and Girls Basketball, Bowling, E-Sports, Boys Wrestling, Fencing

Spring sports: Boys and Girls Lacrosse,  Boys Baseball,  Boys and Girls Tennis, Mountain Biking, Ultimate

Club Sports:  Yoga, Rock Climbing, Bowling, Fitness

Residential life
About 70 percent of the school's students live on campus. A commuter rail station is a short drive away, and the Metro North train connects to Grand Central Terminal in less than one hour.

In 2019, The Storm King School consisted of students from 25 countries.

Black Rock Forest Consortium
The school is a member of the Black Rock Forest Consortium, which administers the Black Rock Forest, a 3,830-acre wilderness adjacent to the campus, which the school also utilizes for its science, environmental and recreational programs. The Head of School is a vice president and a member of the Executive Committee of the Consortium, which includes the American Museum of Natural History, Barnard College, Brooklyn Botanical Gardens, Brookhaven National Laboratory, the Browning School, City College of New York, Columbia University, Convent of the Sacred Heart, the Dalton School, Friends Seminary, New York Academy of Sciences, New York University, Rensselaer Polytechnic Institute, Newburgh School District, and Teacher's College of Columbia University.

Notable alumni
 Cara Castronuova (1998), boxer, two-time Golden Gloves winner, trainer on the NBC's The Biggest Loser
 Mac Gayden (1958), country music star, best known as writer of the hit song Everlasting Love
 Jack Hemingway (1941), writer, conservationist, son of great American author Ernest Hemingway
 Sammy Mejia (2003), professional basketball player, 2nd-round draft pick by the Detroit Pistons
 David Parks (1969), American photographer, film director, publicist and author
 Wally Pfister (1979), Academy Award-winning cinematographer and director
 Tom Price (1951), Olympic rower who competed for the U.S. at the 1952 Olympics
 Walter Reade Jr. (1935, and after whom the school's theater is named), president of the Walter Reade Organization, movie theater owner/operators and film distributors
 Gary Springer (1972), actor and publicist
 Balazs Szabo (1963), Hungarian-born artist and author
 Robert Toricelli (1970), former U.S. congressman and senator from New Jersey
 Whiting Willauer (1923), former U.S. ambassador to Honduras and founder of Civil Air Transport
 Steven Zirnkilton (1976), American voice-over actor, known for providing the opening narration of all U.S. shows in the Law & Order franchise

Notable faculty 

 Burke Boyce (Headmaster 1952-1956) was an Olympic fencer who competed for the U.S. at the 1924 Olympics. He was an integral part of developing the school's fencing program, which continues to this day

References

External links

Official site

Cornwall, New York
Preparatory schools in New York (state)
Private high schools in New York (state)
Boarding schools in New York (state)
Educational institutions established in 1867
1867 establishments in New York (state)